The following events related to sociology occurred in the 1960s.

1960
Raymond Aron's Main Currents in Sociological Thought is published.
Simone de Beauvoir's The Prime of Life is published.
Daniel Bell's The End of Ideology is published.
Friedrich Hayek's The Constitution of Liberty is published.
R.D. Laing's The Divided Self is published.
C. Wright Mills's Listen, Yankee: The Revolution in Cuba and Images of man is published.
Jean-Paul Sartre's Critique of Dialectical Reason is published.
Joan Woodward's The Saleswoman is published.
Michael Young's and Peter Willmott's Family and class in a London suburb is published.
Howard S. Becker serves as president of the ASA.

Deaths
October 5: Alfred L. Kroeber

1961
James S. Coleman's The Adolescent Society is published.
Maurice Duverger's Method Of The Social Sciences is published.
Michel Foucault's Madness and Civilisation is published.
Georges Friedmann's The Anatomy of Work is published.
Morris Ginsberg's Essays in Sociology and Social Philosophy is published.
Erving Goffman's Asylums is published.
George C. Homans' Social Behavior: Its Elementary Forms is published.
R.D. Laing's The Self and Others is published.
Oscar Lewis's The Children of Sanchez is published.
Robert E.L. Faris serves as president of the ASA.

1962
Rachel Carson's Silent Spring is published.
Oliver Cox's Capitalism and American Leadership is published.
George Homans' Sentiments and Activities is published.
Roman Jakobson's Selected Writings is published.
Thomas Kuhn's The Structure of Scientific Revolutions is published.
Edmund Leach's Rethinking Anthropology is published.
C. Wright Mills' The Marxists is published.
Arnold Marshall Rose's Human Behaviour and Social Processes is published.
Richard Titmuss' Income Distribution and Social change is published.
Paul Lazarsfeld serves as president of the American Sociological Association.

Deaths
March 20: C. Wright Mills

1963
Howard Saul Becker's Outsiders is published.
Shmuel Noah Eisenstadt's Political systems of empires is published.
Michel Foucault's The Birth of the Clinic is published.
Erving Goffman's Stigma is published.
Thomas Humphrey Marshall's Class, Citizenship and Social Development is published.
C. Wright Mills's Power, Politics and People is published.
Karl Popper's Conjectures and Refutations is published.
William Lloyd Warner's Yankee City series is published.

1964
Oliver Cox's Capitalism as a system is published.
Georges Friedmann's Industrial Society: The Emergence of the Human Problems of Automation is published.
Ernest Gellner's Thought and Change is published.
Alvin Ward Gouldner's Anti-Minataur; The Myth of Value-free Sociology is published.
R.D. Laing's Sanity, Madness and the Family is published.
Herbert Marcuse's One-Dimensional Man is published.
C. Wright Mills's Sociology and Pragmatism is published.
William Fielding Ogburn's On Cultural and Social Change is published.
Louis Wirth's On Cities and Social Life is published.

1965
Louis Althusser's For Marx is published.
Louis Althusser's Reading Capital is published.
Ralf Dahrendorf's Society and Democracy in Germany is published.
Morris Ginsberg's On Justice In Society is published.
Ian Hacking's The Logic of Statistical Inference is published.
Herbert Marcuse's Repressive Tolerance is published.
Thomas Humphrey Marshall's Social Policy in the Twentieth Century is published.
Daniel Patrick Moynihan's Moynihan Report is published.
Otto Stammer's Political Sociology and Democratic Society is published.
Joan Woodward's Industrial Organisation: Theory and Practice is published.
Florian Znaniecki's Social Relations and Social Roles is published.
Pitirim A. Sorokin serves as president of the ASA.
Founding of the Economic and Social Research Council

Births
Nildo Viana

Deaths
March 13: Corrado Gini

1966
Theodor Adorno's The Negative Dialect is published.
Theodor Adorno's Salmagundi is published.
Robert Adrey's The Central Imperative is published.
Raymond Aron's Peace and War: A Theory of International Relations is published.
Peter Berger's and Thomas Luckmann's The Social Construction of Reality is published.
James S. Coleman's Equality of Educational Opportunity is published.
Maurice Duverger's Political Sociology is published.
Michel Foucault's The Order of Things is published.
Jacques Lacan's Ecrits is published.
R.D. Laing's Interpersonal Perception: A Theory and a Method of Research is published.
Oscar Lewis' La Vida is published.
Barrington Moore Jr.'s Social Origins of Dictatorship and Democracy is published.
Talcott Parsons' Societies: Evolutionary and Comparative Perspectives is published.
Karl Popper's Of Clouds and Clocks is published.
Bryan Wilson's Religion in a Secular Society is published.
Wilbert E. Moore serves as president of the ASA.

Deaths
April 14: George A. Lundberg
October 6: Alexander Morris Carr-Saunders
December 27: Ernest Burgess

1967
Peter Berger's The Sacred Canopy is published.
Peter Michael Blau's and Otis Dudley Duncan's The American Occupational Structure is published.
Andre Gunder Frank's Capitalism and Underdevelopment in Latin America is published.
Harold Garfinkel's Studies in Ethnomethodology is published.
Max Horkheimer's Critique of Instrumental Reason is published.
R.D. Laing's The Politics of Experience is published.
Nicos Panayiotou Mouzelis's Organisation and Bureaucracy: An analysis of Modern Theories is published.
John Rex's and Moore, R. S.'s Race, Community and Conflict: A Study of Sparkbrook is published.
Victor Turner's The Forest of Symbols is published.
 The National Deviancy Conference holds its first meeting at the University of York.

1968
Raymond Aron's The Elusive Revolution is published.
Jürgen Habermas' Knowledge and Human Interests is published.
Viola Klein's and Alva Myrdal's Women's Two Roles: Home and Work, 2nd edition is published.
Geoffry Duncan Mitchell's A Hundred Years of Sociology is published.
Gunnar Myrdal's Asian Drama: An inquiry into the Poverty of Nations is published.
Frank Parkin's Middle class radicalism : the social bases of the British Campaign for Nuclear Disarmament is published.
Nicos Poulantzas' Political Power and Social Classes is published.
Cyril Smith's Adolescence : an introduction to the problems of order and the opportunities for continuity presented by adolescence in Britain is published.
The destruction of the 'Prague Spring' and the failure of the May '68 revolutions results in the beginning of the end of traditional Marxism as a sociological paradigm.

1969
Louis Althusser's Lenin and Philosophy is published.
Herbert Blumer's Symbolic Interactionism is published.
Andre Gunder Frank's Latin America: Underdevelopment or revolution is published.
Andre Gunder Frank's Sociology of Development and Underdevelopment of Sociology is published.
Ernest Gellner's Saints of the Atlas is published.
Edmund Leach's Genesis as Myth and Other Essays is published.
David Matza's Causes of Delinquency is published.
Ralph Miliband's The State in Capitalist Society is published.
Dorothy Swaine Thomas' The Salvage is published.
Victor Turner's The Ritual Process'' is published.

1960s in science
Sociology timelines
Timeline of 1960s counterculture
1960s decade overviews